Dirty Face Creek is a stream in Johnson County, Iowa, in the United States. It is a tributary to Old Mans Creek.

Dirty Face Creek was so named because the children of an early settler there often had dirty faces.

See also
List of rivers of Iowa

References

Rivers of Johnson County, Iowa
Rivers of Iowa